Events from the year 1842 in the United States.

Incumbents

Federal government 
 President: John Tyler (I-Virginia)
 Vice President: vacant
 Chief Justice: Roger B. Taney (Maryland)
 Speaker of the House of Representatives: John White (W-Kentucky)
 Congress: 27th

Events

 February 1 – Willamette University is established in Salem, Oregon.
 March – Commonwealth v. Hunt: the Massachusetts Supreme Court makes strikes and unions legal in the United States.
 March 5 – Mexican troops led by Rafael Vasquez invade Texas, briefly occupy San Antonio, and then head back to the Rio Grande. This is the first such invasion since the Texas Revolution.
 March 9 – First documented discovery of gold in California, by Francisco Lopez at Placerita Canyon in Rancho San Francisco, sparking a small-scale gold rush, mainly of Mexicans from Sonora.
 May 19 – Dorr Rebellion: Militiamen supporting Thomas Wilson Dorr attack the arsenal in Providence, Rhode Island but are repulsed.
 August 1 – A parade in Philadelphia celebrating the end of slavery in the Caribbean is attacked by a mob, leading to the 3-day Lombard Street riot.
 August 4 – The Armed Occupation Act is signed, providing for the armed occupation and settlement of the unsettled part of the Peninsula of East Florida.
 August 9 – The Webster–Ashburton Treaty is signed, establishing the United States–Canada border east of the Rocky Mountains.
 September – Ohio Wesleyan University is established in Delaware, Ohio.
 November 26 – The University of Notre Dame in South Bend, Indiana is established by Father Edward Sorin of the Roman Catholic Congregation of Holy Cross.
 December 20 – The Citadel, The Military College of South Carolina is established.

Undated
 The Sons of Temperance is founded in New York City.
 Founding of:
 Cumberland University (in Lebanon, Tennessee)
 Hollins University (in Roanoke, Virginia by Charles Cocke)
 Villanova University (in Villanova, Pennsylvania by the Augustinian order)
 Indiana University Bloomington
 Indiana University Maurer School of Law
 The Scroll and Key secret society of Yale University is established.

Ongoing
 Second Seminole War (1835–1842)

Births
 January 11 – William James, psychologist and philosopher (died 1910)
 January 21 – Henry Livermore Abbott, Union Army major and brevet brigadier general (died 1864)
 February 3 – Sidney Lanier, musician, poet and writer (died 1881)
 February 28 – Stephen Wallace Dorsey, U.S. Senator from Arkansas from 1873 to 1879 (died 1916)
 March 30 – John Fiske, philosopher (died 1901)
 June 16 – David Herold, accomplice of John Wilkes Booth (died 1865)
 June 24 – Ambrose Bierce, writer and satirist (died c. 1914 in Mexican Revolution)
 July 9 – Mary E. Smith Hayward, businesswoman and suffragist (died 1938)
 July 15 – James Hard, last verified living Union combat veteran of the American Civil War (died 1953)
 July 30 – Thomas J. O'Brien, politician and diplomat (died 1933)
 August 31 – Josephine St. Pierre Ruffin, African American civil rights campaigner and publisher (died 1924)
 September 13 – John H. Bankhead, U.S. Senator from Alabama from 1907 to 1920 (died 1920)
 October 3 – Frederick Rodgers, admiral (died 1917)
 October 14 – Joe Start, baseball first baseman (died 1927)
 October 28 – Anna Elizabeth Dickinson, orator (died 1932)
 December 15 – George Keller, architect (died 1935)

Deaths
 January 4 – John W. Beschter, Jesuit priest and academic (born 1763 in Luxembourg)
 March 4 – James Forten, African American abolitionist and businessman (born 1766)
 March 13 – Samuel Eells, founder of Alpha Delta Phi fraternity (born 1810)
 July 23 – Timothy Swan, psalmist and hatter (born 1758)
 September 10 – Letitia Tyler, First Lady of the United States from 1841 to 1842 as wife of 10th U.S. President John Tyler (born 1790)
 October 2 – William Ellery Channing, Unitarian theologian and minister (born 1780)
 November 3 – Robert Smith, 6th United States Secretary of State (born 1757)
 December 1 – Philip Spencer, founder of Chi Psi fraternity and midshipman aboard  (born 1823)
 December 31 – George Cassedy, U.S. Representative from New Jersey (born 1783)

See also
Timeline of United States history (1820–1859)

External links
 

 
1840s in the United States
United States
United States
Years of the 19th century in the United States